Firmin Le Bourhis (18 May 1950 – 21 April 2018) was a French detective writer. He authored 32 detective novels over the course of 18 years. He died of a heart attack on his way to the Envolée des livres, a book festival in Châteauroux.

References

1950 births
2018 deaths
People from Concarneau
French detective fiction writers
20th-century French novelists
21st-century French novelists